Make Your Own Danger is the fourth full-length album by singer-songwriter Alina Simone, released on June 7, 2011.

Track listing

References

External links
Alina Simone Bandcamp page for Make Your Own Danger

2011 albums